Andrew Bell (born October 27, 1978 in Guildford, England) is a British-born American artist and founder of Dead Zebra Inc. He specializes in creating collectible designer toys.  Bell also works in a variety of other mediums from illustrations and paintings to sculptures. Much of his work is brought together by a sense of humor that often belies a more serious and sombre message. His company and toys have been featured in publications such as the New York Times. In addition to his extensive toy and art catalog, he has also published three books of drawings.

Career
Bell began his graphic arts career as an intern at Marvel Comics while attending the School of Visual Arts in New York. After completing his internship, he continued to work there for another two years as a freelance designer. From 2000 to 2005, he worked for Nickelodeon as a senior designer.  Bell left Nickelodeon in 2005 in order to focus on his own projects and his company, Dead Zebra.

Artwork
Bell has produced many forms of art, including drawings, paintings, sculptures and toys which have all been featured in a variety of exhibitions. His art exhibitions have been produced for national and international audiences and showcase some of his more intricate pieces. In a 2009 exhibition he presented his Darth Vader Helmet at The Andy Warhol Museum.

Toy production
In the realm of designer toys Bell has contributed to expanding what was once a small coterie, into a more mainstream audience. His collaboration with companies such as Google have opened up awareness of designer toys to new audiences. His collaboration with Google resulted in a set of vinyl collectible figurines based on the mascot for the popular Android operating system.  These figurines have become very popular with enthusiasts. To date, there is a 12-piece series 1, 3 special edition figurines, and one DIY blank model. A series 2 set of figurines was released in early March 2011.

Bell also collaborated with MyPlasticHeart which resulted in a limited special edition vinyl toy inspired by the site's logo.  This toy was aimed more at long time urban vinyl collectors who have an affinity to the site. The toy was entitled A-Type - Rai Red Edition. The name A-Type has a number of different connotations that helped describe the design of the toy.

In addition to his collaborations Bell has produced some platform and original designs. His first toy, produced in 2005, was entitled Groob.  He produced a custom kidrobot in 2009 entitled Kidreaper15. This piece featured a glow in the dark skeleton and included a fabric cloak and a scythe. Another example of Bell's original designs is the O-No Sushi series of toys, based on Japanese food.

Publications
Bell has published three books of drawings.  The first book was a small softcover book entitled You've Gone Too Far.  This was a limited run of only 666 copies.  Bell's second book was entitled Now You've Done It : A Collection of Creatures.  His latest book is entitled Do Not Eat! : A Collection of Creatures by Andrew Bell.  His work has been featured in two other books by Paul Budnitz about designer toys, I Am Plastic by Paul Budnitz, and I Am Plastic Too: The Next Generation of Designer Toys.

References

External links
 Dead Zebra Inc.
 Creatures In My Head

Living people
1978 births